was a Japanese politician who served in the House of Representatives from 1947 to 1990, and was Prime Minister of Japan from 1972 to 1974.

After a power struggle with Takeo Fukuda, he became the most influential member of the ruling Liberal Democratic Party from the mid-1960s until the mid-1980s. He was a central figure in several political scandals, culminating in the Lockheed bribery scandals of 1976 which led to his arrest and trial; he was found guilty by two lower courts, but his case remained open before the Supreme Court through his death. The scandals, coupled with a debilitating stroke he suffered in 1985, led to the collapse of his political faction, with most members regrouping under the leadership of Noboru Takeshita in 1987.

(The title of "Shadow Shōgun" has since been used to describe Ichirō Ozawa.) He was strongly identified with the construction industry but never served as construction minister. His daughter Makiko Tanaka and son-in-law Naoki Tanaka remain active political figures in Japan.

Early life and education
Tanaka was born on 4 May 1918, in Futamura, Niigata Prefecture (present-day Kashiwazaki, Niigata), the second son of farmer Kakuji Tanaka and his wife Fume. He had seven siblings (an elder brother, two elder sisters and four younger sisters) but was the only son who survived into adulthood. Although a farming family, his father was a cow and horse trader and his grandfather Sutekichi Tanaka had worked as a temple and shrine carpenter. His mother worked even after everyone else went to sleep and was attached to her grandmother. When Tanaka was young, his father was involved with a series of financially disastrous ventures in koi farming, importing cattle and starting Niigata's first dairy farm, which caused the family to fall into extreme poverty. Tanaka contracted diphtheria at a young age and the aftereffect caused him to stutter. Kakuei left school at the age of fifteen and worked construction jobs while studying part-time at night.

In 1937, while running errands for a construction firm, Tanaka ran into an elevator occupied by the Viscount Masatoshi Ōkōchi, head of the Riken corporation. Ōkōchi, apparently impressed with Tanaka's energy and ambition, agreed to help the young man start a drafting office in Tokyo. Japan did not have a state qualification for architects at the time; Tanaka would have a role in creating the licensing system for architects later in his career.

The drafting office only kept Tanaka busy for two years: he was drafted into the army in 1939 and sent to Manchuria, where he served as an enlisted clerk in the Morioka Cavalry, reaching the rank of superior private (jōtōhei) in March 1940.  After two years in the military, he contracted pneumonia in February 1941 and was returned to Tokyo to recover; he never re-enlisted, leaving the army in October.

Back in Japan, Tanaka ended up at the Sakamoto Civil Engineering firm, looking for office space to restart his drafting business. There, he met the late company president's widow, who not only gave him the real estate he needed, but also asked him to marry her daughter, Sakamoto Hana. Tanaka accepted, and married his way into the upper class.

Rise into politics

In 1942, Tanaka took over the Sakamoto company and renamed it Tanaka Civil Engineering and Construction Industries. He soon had two children: a son named Masanori Tanaka in 1942 (died 1948), and a daughter named Makiko Tanaka in 1944.

Luck favored Tanaka during the endgame of World War II.  None of his major buildings were damaged in the firebombing of Tokyo, and just weeks before the Japanese surrender, he travelled to Seoul and cashed in ¥15b (about US$78m) in Japanese war bonds.  In December 1945, as the first postwar Diet was being planned by the American occupation authorities, Tanaka was able to give generous donations to an associate affiliated with the Japan Moderate Progressive Party (Nihon Shinpoto).

In 1946, he moved from Tokyo to Niigata to prepare his first bid for a Diet seat: he worked around the election laws of the time by buying buildings throughout the district and placing large "TANAKA" signs on them.  However, his bid unraveled at the last minute when three other JMPP candidates entered the race.  Tanaka only captured 4% of the vote in the general election.

In 1947, however, he placed third in his district after a strategy targeting rural voters.  He took his Diet seat that year as a member of the new Democratic Party (Minshuto).  In the Diet, he became friends with former prime minister Kijūrō Shidehara and joined Shidehara's Dōshi Club.  Then in 1948, the Doshi Club defected to the new Democratic Liberal Party, and Tanaka instantly won favor with the DLP's leader, Shigeru Yoshida. Yoshida appointed Tanaka as a Vice Minister of Justice, the youngest in the nation's history.

Then, on 13 December, Tanaka was arrested and imprisoned on charges of accepting ¥1m (US$13,000) in bribes from coal mining interests in Kyūshū.  Yoshida and the DLP dropped most of their ties with Tanaka, removed him from his official party posts, and refused to fund his next re-election bid.  Despite this, Tanaka announced his candidacy for the 1949 general election, and was released from prison in January after securing bail.  He was re-elected, and made a deal with Chief Cabinet Secretary Eisaku Satō to resign his vice-ministerial post in exchange for continued membership in the DLP.

The Tokyo District Court found Tanaka guilty in 1950, and Tanaka responded by filing an appeal.  In the meantime, he took over the failing Nagaoka Railway that linked Niigata to Tokyo, and through a combination of good management and good luck, brought it back into operation in 1951.  In that year's election, he was re-elected to the Diet in a landslide victory, and many of the railroad's employees came out to campaign for him.  That year's election was also the first in which he was supported by billionaire capitalist Kenji Osano, who would remain one of Tanaka's most loyal supporters to the end.

Etsuzankai

Tanaka's most important support base, however, was a group called Etsuzankai (越山会, literally "Niigata Mountain Association").  Etsuzankai's function was to screen various petitions from villagers in rural parts of Niigata.  Tanaka would answer these petitions with government-funded pork barrel projects.  In turn, the local villagers all financially supported Etsuzankai, which, in its turn, funded the re-election campaigns of local Diet members, including Tanaka.  At its peak, Etsuzankai had 100,000 members.

The projects funded by Etsuzankai included the Tadami River hydroelectric power project, the New Shimizu Tunnel, and, perhaps most infamously, the Jōetsu Shinkansen high-speed rail line.

During the 1950s, Tanaka brought Etsuzankai members to his residence in Tokyo by bus, met with each of them individually, and then provided them with tours of the Diet and Imperial Palace.  This practice made Etsuzankai the most tightly knit political organization in Japanese history, and it also furthered Tanaka's increasingly gangster-like image.

Consolidation of power
Tanaka became a member of the Liberal Democratic Party in 1955, when it absorbed the DLP.

When Nobusuke Kishi became prime minister in 1957, Tanaka was given his first cabinet post, Minister of Posts and Telecommunications. In this role, he granted the first television broadcasting licenses in Japan.

He already carried great influence in the LDP, despite his lack of seniority: this was partly because of his friendship with future prime minister Eisaku Satō, and partly because his stepdaughter had married future prime minister Hayato Ikeda's nephew, giving him a personal relationship with both key heads of the party.

Under Ikeda's cabinet, Tanaka became chairman of the Policy Affairs Research Council, and eventually Minister of Finance. Tanaka's term as minister of finance saw some of the highest economic growth in Japanese history. When Satō became prime minister in 1965, Tanaka was slated to become the LDP's new secretary general, but the emergence of the Black Mist Scandal, where Tanaka was accused of shady land deals in Tokyo, meant that Takeo Fukuda got the job instead.

Fukuda and Tanaka soon became the two battling heir apparents of Satō's faction, and their rivalry was dubbed by the Japanese press as the "Kaku-Fuku War."  Despite the scandal, Tanaka made a record showing in the 1967 general election, and Satō re-appointed him as secretary general, moving Fukuda to the post of finance minister. In 1971, Satō gave Tanaka another important stepping stone to taking over the government: minister of international trade and industry.

As head of MITI, Tanaka gained public support again by standing up to U.S. negotiators who wanted Japan to impose export caps on several products.  He had so many contacts within the American diplomatic corps that he was said to have played a larger role in the repatriation of Okinawa than Satō himself.

In June 1971, he published his book, "Theory of Remodeling the Japanese Islands." He made a de facto government pledge with the purpose of "promoting regional decentralization". This book initially sold 910,000 copies, partly because Tanaka later took the position of prime minister, and was ranked fourth in the year. It became a best seller.

Prime minister

Although Satō wanted Fukuda to become the next prime minister, Tanaka's popularity, along with support from the factions of Yasuhiro Nakasone and Masayoshi Ōhira, gave him a 282–190 victory over Fukuda in the LDP's 1971 party president election. He entered the office with the highest popularity rating of any new premier in Japanese history.

Foreign policy

One of Tanaka's most remembered achievements is normalizing Japanese relations with the People's Republic of China, which occurred around the same time as Richard Nixon's efforts to do the same for Chinese relations with the United States. In 1972, Tanaka met with Chinese premier Zhou Enlai to discuss the normalization of relations between the two countries. Among other matters, they discussed the Senkaku Islands, which would later become a major point of contention between the two countries. Tanaka reportedly asked Zhou "What is your view on the Senkaku Islands? Some people say things about them to me," to which Zhou replied "I do not want to talk about it this time. If there wasn't oil, neither Taiwan nor the United States would make this an issue." Just two months after taking office, Tanaka met Chinese Communist Party chairman Mao Zedong.

During 1973 and 1974, Tanaka visited the United States, France, Britain, West Germany, Italy, the Soviet Union, the Philippines, Thailand, Singapore, Malaysia and Indonesia. He appeared on the US television program Meet the Press to have a direct dialogue with Americans during his visit to the US in July/August 1973. His visit to Europe was the first visit by a Japanese prime minister since 1962, and his visit to the USSR was the first since 1956.

His state visit to Indonesia as invited by President Soeharto to discuss Indo-Japanese trade relations was protested by a number of local anti-Japanese sentiments denying international investment, which occurred on 15 January 1974. Japanese-manufactured material and buildings were destroyed by Indonesian protesters. 11 people were dead, a further 300 were injured, and 775 protesters were arrested. As a result, the Soeharto regime dissolved the president's private counselor constitution and took control of the national security leadership. The incident henceforth became well known as the Malari Incident (Peristiwa Malari).

Economic policy
Upon taking office in 1972, Tanaka published an ambitious infrastructure plan for Japan which called for a new network of expressways and high-speed rail lines throughout the country. It was a plan that Tanaka once wrote in his book "Theory of Remodeling the Japanese Islands".He envisioned moving more economic functions to secondary cities with populations in the 300,000–400,000 range, and linking these cities to Tokyo, Osaka and other cores by high-speed rail, a revolutionary view at a time when only one Shinkansen line existed.

Tanaka's government expanded the welfare state through measures such as the doubling of national pension benefits, the introduction of free medical care for the elderly, the provision of child allowances in 1972, and the indexation of pensions to the rate of inflation in 1973. In 1973, the Pollution Health Damage Compensation Law was passed with the purpose of paying victims of specific diseases in certain Government-designated localities compensation benefits and medical expenses, together with providing health and welfare services required by these families.

The Japanese economy, and thus Tanaka's popularity, was severely hurt by the inflationary effects of the 1973 oil crisis.

Resignation
In October 1974, the popular Bungeishunjū magazine published an article detailing how businesspeople close to Tanaka had profited by setting up paper companies to purchase land in remote areas immediately prior to the announcement of public works projects nearby. Although this implied a degree of corruption, none of the activity detailed was actually illegal.

The article inspired Tanaka's LDP rivals to open a public inquiry in the Diet (among other things, Tanaka had purchased a geisha and used her name for a number of shady land deals in Tokyo during the mid-sixties). The Diet commission called Etsuzankai's treasurer, Aki Sato, as its first witness.  Unknown to the committee members, Sato and Tanaka had been involved in a romantic relationship for several years, and Tanaka took pity on Sato's troubled upbringing. Rather than let her take the stand, he announced his resignation on 26 November 1974. The announcement was read by Chief Cabinet Secretary Noboru Takeshita.

The Tanaka faction supported Takeo Miki's "clean government" bid to become prime minister, and Tanaka once again became a rank-and-file Diet member.

Lockheed scandal and aftermath

On 6 February 1976, the vice chairman of the Lockheed Corporation told a United States Senate subcommittee that Tanaka had accepted $1.8 million in bribes through the trading company Marubeni during his term as prime minister, in return for having All Nippon Airways purchase 21 Lockheed L-1011 aircraft in 1972. Although Henry Kissinger tried to stop the details from making their way to the Japanese government, fearing that it would harm the two countries' security relationship, Miki pushed a bill through the Diet that requested information from the Senate. Tanaka was arrested on 27 July 1976, initially on charges of violating Japanese foreign exchange restrictions by not reporting the payment. He was released in August on a ¥200m (US$690,000) bond. Tanaka was located in the Tokyo Detention House. Many Tanaka supporters viewed the scandal as an effort by American multinational corporations to "get" Tanaka in response to his hard-line stance in trade talks with the United States, based on the fact that the scandal originated with congressional testimony in the US.

Tanaka's trial did not end his political influence. His faction had 70 to 80 members prior to his arrest in 1976, but grew to over 150 members by 1981, more than one-third of the total LDP representation in the Diet. In retaliation for Miki's actions, Tanaka persuaded his faction to vote for Fukuda in the 1976 "Lockheed Election". The two old rivals did not cooperate for long, however: in 1978, Tanaka threw his faction behind Ohira's. After Ohira died in 1980, the Tanaka faction elected Zenkō Suzuki. In 1982, Yasuhiro Nakasone was elected president of the LDP (and therefore as prime minister) amid allegations from opponents that he would be under Tanaka's control.

The Lockheed trial ended on 12 October 1983. Tanaka was found guilty and sentenced to 4 years in jail and a 500 million yen fine. Rather than cave in, he filed an appeal and announced that he would not leave the Diet as long as his constituents supported him. This sparked a month-long war in the Diet over whether or not to censure Tanaka; eventually, Prime Minister Nakasone, himself elected by Tanaka's faction, dissolved the Diet and called for a new election, stating that "in view of the current unusual parliamentary situation, there is a need for refreshing the people's minds as quickly as possible."

In the "Second Lockheed Election" of December 1983, Tanaka retained his Diet seat by an unprecedented margin, winning more votes than any other candidate in the country. The LDP performed poorly, and Prime Minister Nakasone publicly vowed to distance the party from Tanaka's politics, stating that the party should be "cleansed" with a new code of ethics. Nakasone placed six members of the Tanaka faction on his 1984 cabinet, including future prime minister Noboru Takeshita.

Defections to Takeshita faction

Amid Tanaka's objections, Noboru Takeshita formed a "study group" called Soseikai on 7 February 1985, which counted among its ranks 43 of the 121 Tanaka faction members. Weeks after this defection, Tanaka suffered a stroke on 27 February and became hospitalized, sparking uncertainty over the future of his faction. His daughter Makiko spirited him from the hospital after authorities refused to give the former prime minister an entire floor, and the Diet session halted entirely while details of Tanaka's condition leaked out to the press. Susumu Nikaido, the titular chairman of Tanaka's faction, mounted a campaign against Takeshita to attempt to win over members of Tanaka's faction amid uncertainty as to his condition, which was only known to Tanaka's family and doctors. The division in the Tanaka faction was a boon for smaller LDP faction leaders, particularly Prime Minister Nakasone who no longer had to worry about a single dominant force within the LDP. Public chiding of Tanaka continued during 1985, including Sega's publication of an arcade game titled  featuring a caricature of Tanaka dodging various celebrities in a quest to collect gold bars and grow wealthy, with the title punning on the Japanese term for "prime minister", Sōri (総理).

Tanaka remained in convalescence through the election of 1986, where he retained his Diet seat. On New Year's Day of 1987, he made his first public appearance since the stroke, and was clearly in poor condition: half of his face was paralyzed, and he was grossly overweight. The Tokyo High Court dismissed Tanaka's appeal on 29 July 1987, and the original sentence passed down in 1983 was reinstated. Tanaka immediately posted bail and appealed to the Supreme Court.

Meanwhile, despite Nikaido's efforts, by July 1987 the Takeshita faction counted 113 of the 143 Tanaka faction members, while only thirteen supported Nikaido. The Tanaka faction members who moved to Takeshita's faction included Ichirō Ozawa, Tsutomu Hata, Ryutaro Hashimoto, Keizō Obuchi and Kozo Watanabe. Takeshita won the LDP leadership election in November 1987 and served as prime minister until resigning amid the Recruit scandal in June 1989.

Retirement and death
While his appeal lingered in the Court's docket, Tanaka's medical condition deteriorated. He announced his retirement from politics in October 1989, at the age of 71, in an announcement made by his son-in-law Naoki Tanaka. The announcement ended his 42-year career in politics; the remnants of his faction, now led by former Prime Minister Takeshita, remained the most powerful bloc within the LDP at the time of his retirement. In 1993, a number of members of his faction broke away from the LDP to form part of an Eight-party Alliance government under Morihiro Hosokawa.

Tanaka was later diagnosed with diabetes, and died of pneumonia at Keio University Hospital at 2:04 p.m. on 16 December 1993. Following his death, his home in northern Tokyo was "besieged" by supporters and journalists.

Honours

Foreign honours
:
 Grand Collar of the Order of Sikatuna

Legacy
Tanaka's faction remained within the Liberal Democratic Party even after his death. It split in 1992, after Noboru Takeshita was sidelined by the Recruit scandal, with Tsutomu Hata and Ichiro Ozawa leaving the LDP and forming the Japan Renewal Party. Keizo Obuchi inherited what was left of the Tanaka faction, supported the election of Ryutaro Hashimoto as prime minister, and himself became prime minister from 1999 to 2000. After Obuchi's death, Hashimoto led the faction until refusing to stand in the 2005 general election due to a fundraising scandal, and died shortly thereafter. The remnants of the faction, formally known by this time as Heisei Kenkyūkai (Heisei Research Council), remained active under the leadership of Yūji Tsushima, who resigned prior to the 2009 general election, passing control to Fukushiro Nukaga. The faction raised much less in donations during the 1990s and 2000s than it did under Tanaka and Takeshita in the 1980s, as electoral reforms enacted in 1994, coupled with new campaign finance regulations and the ongoing economic slump that followed the Japanese asset price bubble, weakened the power of factions in Japanese politics.

Tanaka built his faction largely by recruiting and supporting new candidates. This technique was used to some success by two prominent politicians decades later: Junichiro Koizumi, who recruited a large number of new LDP representatives dubbed "Koizumi Children" in the 2005 election, and Ichiro Ozawa, who did the same for the Democratic Party of Japan in the 2009 election. However, neither the "Koizumi Children" nor the "Ozawa Children" showed the same degree of loyalty as the Tanaka faction, with many "Koizumi Children" voting against Koizumi's reform agenda, and many "Ozawa Children" voting against Ozawa in his 2010 bid for the DPJ presidency.

Makiko Tanaka, who was not associated with Etsuzankai, was elected to her father's old seat in Niigata in the 1993 election and became foreign minister in the Koizumi cabinet in 2001. Due in part to her father's historical role in Sino-Japanese relations, she became popular in the People's Republic of China and publicly opposed several anti-PRC actions by Japan and the United States, including Koizumi's visits to Yasukuni Shrine. She lost her seat in the December 2012 general election, by which point Etsuzankai had disbanded with only a few elderly surviving members.

See also 
 I'm Sorry

References

External links

 Tanaka biography, rcrinc.com; accessed 18 June 2015.

|-

|-

|-

|-

|-

|-

|-

1918 births
1993 deaths
20th-century prime ministers of Japan
Prime Ministers of Japan
Government ministers of Japan
Ministers of Finance of Japan
Democratic Party (Japan, 1947) politicians
Democratic Liberal Party (Japan) politicians
Deaths from pneumonia in Japan
People convicted of bribery
Japanese racehorse owners and breeders
Liberal Democratic Party (Japan) politicians
Members of the House of Representatives (Japan)
Japanese politicians convicted of crimes
People from Niigata Prefecture
20th-century Japanese politicians
Lockheed bribery scandals
Heads of government who were later imprisoned
Military personnel of the Second Sino-Japanese War
Politicians from Niigata Prefecture
Imperial Japanese Army soldiers